Deraeocoris bakeri is a species of plant bug in the family Miridae. It is found in North America.

References

Further reading

 
 
 
 
 
 
 

Insects described in 1921
Deraeocorini